Roosevelt School District is the name of several school districts in the United States:

Roosevelt Elementary School District, Phoenix, Arizona
Roosevelt Public School District, Roosevelt, New Jersey
Roosevelt School District, Roosevelt, New York
Roosevelt School District, Roosevelt, Washington
Roosevelt Independent School District, in Lubbock County, Texas

See also
 Roosevelt School (disambiguation)
 Roosevelt (disambiguation)